Sankar Das Sarma is an India-born American theoretical condensed matter physicist, who has worked in the broad research topics of theoretical physics, condensed matter physics, statistical mechanics, quantum physics, and quantum information. He has been a member of the Department of Physics at University of Maryland, College Park since 1980.

Das Sarma is the Richard E. Prange Chair in Physics,  a Distinguished University Professor, a Fellow of the Joint Quantum Institute (JQI), and the Director of the Condensed Matter Theory Center at the University of Maryland, College Park.  Das Sarma has co-authored more than 800 articles in the Physical Review Journal series of the American Physical Society, including more than 150 publications in Physical Review Letters. Das Sarma coauthored several well-known and highly-cited review articles on spintronics, non-Abelian anyons and topological quantum computation, graphene, and Majorana zero modes.  With more than 90,000 citations to his publications and with more than 150 publications garnering more than 100 citations each,  he is one of the Institute for Scientific Information (ISI) Highly-Cited Researchers as well as a Web of Science Highly Cited and Most Influential Researcher. Das Sarma has been one of the Highly-Cited Researchers of the Web of Science, continuously during the 2001-2021 time period and is among the most cited theoretical physicists in the 21st century. Das Sarma is the most cited author in the journal npj Quantum Information.

Career
Das Sarma came to the United States of America from India as a physics graduate student in 1974 after finishing his secondary school (Hare School in Kolkata) and undergraduate education at Presidency College in Calcutta, India (now Presidency University in Kolkata) where he was born. He received his PhD in theoretical physics from Brown University in 1979 as a doctoral student of John Quinn.

In collaboration with Chetan Nayak and Michael Freedman of Microsoft Research, Das Sarma introduced the  topological qubit  in 2005, which has led to experiments in building a fault-tolerant quantum computer based on two-dimensional semiconductor structures.  Das Sarma's work on graphene has led to the theoretical understanding of graphene carrier transport properties at low densities where the inhomogeneous electron-hole puddles dominate the graphene landscape.  In 2006 Das Sarma with Euyheon Hwang provided the basic theory for collective modes and dielectric response in graphene and related chiral two-dimensional materials. This work is a Milestone in the Physical Review. In 2011 Das Sarma and collaborators introduced a new class of lattice tight-binding flat-band systems with nontrivial Chern numbers which belongs to the universality class of continuum quantum Hall and fractional quantum Hall systems without any external magnetic fields.  Such flat-band tight-binding systems with non-trivial Chern numbers have substantially enhanced the types of possible physical systems for the realization of topological matter.

Among Das Sarma's other well-known theoretical contributions to condensed matter physics are: the self-consistent electronic structure calculation of semiconductor heterojunction-based high electron mobility transistor structures, electron-phonon interaction induced polaron effects in low dimensional systems, collective excitation and quasiparticle modes in semiconductor structures such as quantum wire, quantum well and superlattice, hot electron relaxation in semiconductors, quantum Anderson localization, many-body effects and electron-electron interaction in semiconductors, canted antiferromagnetic states in quantum Hall effect, various spin transistor systems, magnetic polaron theory of diluted magnetic semiconductors, coupled spin qubits in semiconductor quantum dots, theory of quantum decoherence of localized electron spins in solids, central spin decoherence problem, spectral diffusion of electron spins in solids, dynamical decoupling and quantum control, quantum transport theory in low dimensional semiconductors, bilayer quantum Hall systems, and realistic solid-state effects in the fractional quantum Hall effect phenomena, e.g, the Zhang-Das Sarma model.

In 2010, Das Sarma and collaborators, made a prediction that Majorana fermions will be found in condensed matter, in particular, in semiconductor nanowires. This has led to considerable experimental activity, led by Microsoft Corporation, to produce a topological quantum computer.

Das Sarma also made important contributions to the classical statistical mechanics problem of dynamical growth of systems far from equilibrium where his work introduced the standard model for understanding the molecular beam epitaxy of thin film growth, both from a continuum field theory viewpoint in terms of the so-called Villain-Lai-Das Sarma equation and from the discrete atomistic viewpoint in terms of the so-called Das Sarma-Tamborenea model.

Das Sarma has mentored many PhD students and postdoctoral research associates at the University of Maryland, having supervised 30 PhD students and 115 postdoctoral fellows in the 1985–2016 period, with about 80 of these advisees working as theoretical physicists and physics professors all over the world.  Das Sarma's research collaborators, as reflected in the co-authors of his scholarly publications, exceed 200 and span six continents.  Although Das Sarma has spent his entire academic life as a faculty member at Maryland, he has been a visiting professor at many institutions during his professional career, including Technical University of Munich, IBM Thomas J. Watson Research Center, University of Hamburg, Cambridge University, University of California, Santa Barbara, University of New South Wales, Sandia National Laboratories, University of Melbourne, Kavli Institute for Theoretical Physics in Santa Barbara, Institute for Theoretical Physics in Beijing, and Microsoft Station Q Research Center.

Books

External links

Living people
21st-century American physicists
University of Maryland, College Park faculty
1953 births
Theoretical physicists
Indian condensed matter physicists
Brown University alumni
Scientists from Kolkata
Fellows of the American Physical Society